Reef Diver was an Enterprise amusement ride in the Ocean Parade section of Dreamworld on the Gold Coast, Queensland, Australia.

History
Reef Diver opened in the County Fair section of Dreamworld in 1983. At that time it operated under the name Enterprise. In 2000, the actual ride from Schwarzkopf Industries was replaced with a new one from Meisho. In 2002, Ocean Parade was expanded to encompass the remaining rides in County Fair. The processed involved the renaming and retheming of the ride to Reef Diver. On 28 April 2014, Reef Diver closed and was subsequently removed.

Ride
The Reef Diver is an Enterprise ride. Two riders sit inline in each of 20 gondolas arranged in an  circle. A hydraulically powered arm underneath the ride then raises and tilts the frame so that the ride is rotating at 87° from the horizontal, transforming the ride from a horizontal experience to a nearly vertical one. The Reef Diver features no safety restraints as the centrifugal force applied to the riders is sufficient to keep them pinned in their seats. Riders can experience up to 3 times the force of gravity during the ride.

References

External links
Reef Diver on the official Dreamworld website

Amusement rides introduced in 1983
Amusement rides manufactured by Sanoyas Hishino Meisho
Amusement rides that closed in 2014
Dreamworld (Australia)